Mario Martín Orozco Sánchez (born March 25, 1993) is a Mexican professional footballer who plays as a left back for Alebrijes de Oaxaca.

Career

C.D. Guadalajara
Orozco spent his whole youth career at C.D. Guadalajara's youth academy.

Coras de Tepic (loan)
In July 2015, it was announced Orozco was sent out on loan to Ascenso MX club Coras de Tepic in order to gain professional playing experience. He made his professional debut on 24 July 2015 against Murciélagos.

Club Atlético Zacatepec (loan)
On June 10, 2017, Orozco was announced as one of the many who were loaned out from Chivas.

References

External links
 
 Mario Orozco at Chivas 
 
 

1994 births
Living people
Footballers from Colima
Mexican footballers
C.D. Guadalajara footballers
Coras de Nayarit F.C. footballers
Club Atlético Zacatepec players
Alebrijes de Oaxaca players
Ascenso MX players
Association football fullbacks
People from Villa de Álvarez, Colima